{{Infobox concert
| concert_tour_name = Girls' Generation Japan 3rd Tour 2014
| image = 
| landscape = yes
| alt = 
| caption = 
| artist = Girls' Generation
| location = Japan
| type = Japan
| album = Love & Peace
| start_date = 
| end_date = 
| number_of_legs = 7
| number_of_shows = 2 in Fukuoka2 in Hiroshima3 in Kobe2 in Nagoya3 in Osaka3 in Saitama3 in Tokyo18 in total
| website = 
| last_tour = Girls' Generation World Tour Girls & Peace(2013–14)
| this_tour = Girls' Generation Japan 3rd Tour 2014
| next_tour = Girls' Generation "The Best Live" at Tokyo Dome(2014)
}}Girls' Generation Japan 3rd Tour 2014 is the third concert tour by South Korean girl group Girls' Generation to promote their third Japanese album, Love & Peace. It gathered an audience of more than 200,000. This is the final tour to include former member Jessica Jung, who left the group on September 30, 2014.

It was announced on November 29, 2013, that Girls' Generation would embark on their third nationwide Japan tour on April 26, 2014, with an initial total of 17 stops in support of their third Japanese studio album, Love & Peace.

Through three concert tours in Japan since 2011, the group attracted a cumulative total of 550,000 spectators, setting the record for a K-pop girl group. At their latest three-day concert series held in Tokyo from July 11, the group enthralled Japanese fans by performing mega-hits including “Gee,” “I Got a Boy,” “Mr. Mr,” as well as tracks such as “Motorcycle” and “Gossip Girls” on their third Japanese full-length album. The group also unveiled  their brand new ballad “Indestructible” from the new album “THE BEST” set to drop on July 23 in Japan.

Background
TV Media WOWOW filmed, once again, the group's July 13, 2014, performance at Yoyogi National Stadium. The show aired on WOWOW's music channel on September 23, including many shows from the girls.

Set list
Main Set

Special Set List

Tour dates

DVDGirls' Generation Love & Peace Japan 3rd Tour'' is the tenth DVD and Blu-ray release from South Korean girl group Girls' Generation. It was released on December 24, 2014, in Japan.

History
The DVD and Blu-ray features their third nationwide tour, visiting seven venues for a total of 17 shows. There will be four different versions: a DVD and Blu-ray version, both with a regular and limited edition. The limited editions will come with special footage content, a 44-page photobook pamphlet, and a tour documentary.

Track list

Charts

Sales and certifications

Release history

References

Girls' Generation concert tours
2014 concert tours
Concert tours of Japan
2014 in Japanese music
Girls' Generation video albums